The Beyman Bros are Christopher Guest (This Is Spinal Tap, A Mighty Wind, Best In Show), David Nichtern (Grammy-nominated composer and producer) and C.J. Vanston (Ringo Starr, Barbra Streisand, Dolly Parton, Joe Cocker). Their music is an instrumental mix of Americana, bluegrass and jazz elements. A full-length release, Memories of Summer as a Child, was released on January 20, 2009 on Dharma Moon.

Discography

Albums
Memories of Summer as a Child (2009)

American instrumental musical groups
American bluegrass music groups
American jazz ensembles